Brennan Award may refer to:

Christopher Brennan Award, Australian poetry award.
Michael Brennan Award, financial economics award.
William J. Brennan Award, public interest and free expression awards.